Three ships of the Royal Norwegian Navy have borne the name HNoMS Vale, after Váli, son of the god Odin and the giantess Rindr:

  was a schooner.
  was a  Rendel gunboat built for the Royal Norwegian Navy at Karljohansvern Naval Yard in 1874.
  was minelayer built in 1978, and sold to the Latvian Navy in 2003.

Royal Norwegian Navy ship names